The 2019–20 Chattanooga FC season was the club's first season playing in the National Independent Soccer Association, a newly established third division soccer league in the United States, and first professional season since being established in 2009.

Overview
Chattanooga FC was admitted into the National Independent Soccer Association on August 15, 2019 and latter fully accepted by the U.S. Soccer Federation on December 11, 2019, and will start competing in the 2020 Spring season. The team had spent its entire eleven-year history in the National Premier Soccer League, a semi-pro league generally considered the fourth tier of U.S. Soccer, and reached its National Final on four separate occasions (2010, 2012, 2014, & 2015) which is a shared record for the most finals appearance with Sonoma County Sol.

Prior to joining NISA, Chattanooga hosted two international friendlies. On May 25, the team hosted La Liga side Real Betis in the latter's first game ever in the United States. The home side scored twice in the final ten minutes in the 4–3 loss in front of 6,115 fans at Finley Stadium. The next month, the team took part in 30-time Guatemalan league champion C.S.D. Municipal during its pre-season tour of the U.S., drawing 1–1 at Ridgeland High School in Rossville, Georgia.

On April 27, 2020, following a stoppage of play and subsequent extension due to the COVID-19 pandemic, NISA announced the cancellation of the 2020 Spring season.

Players and staff

Current roster

Technical staff

Transfers

In

Friendlies

Competitions

NISA Fall season

Chattanooga did not take part in the 2019 NISA Fall season in an official capacity. On August 15, the NISA Board of Governors announced the team, along with Detroit City FC and Oakland Roots SC, had been accepted into the league but would not begin full league play until Spring 2020. During the fall, Chattanooga did play a friendly home-and-away series against NISA side Stumptown Athletic with both games ending in a draw.

NISA Spring season

Details for the 2020 NISA Spring season were announced January 27, 2020.

Standings

Results summary

Matches

U.S. Open Cup 

For the first time in its history, Chattanooga will automatically qualify for the U.S. Open Cup tournament. The team will enter the 2020 tournament with the rest of the National Independent Soccer Association teams in the Second Round. It was announced on January 29 that their first opponent would be USL Championship side Memphis 901 FC.

Squad statistics

Appearances and goals 

|-
! colspan="16" style="background:#dcdcdc; text-align:center"| Goalkeepers

|-
! colspan="16" style="background:#dcdcdc; text-align:center"| Defenders

|-
! colspan="16" style="background:#dcdcdc; text-align:center"| Midfielders

|-
! colspan="16" style="background:#dcdcdc; text-align:center"| Forwards

|-
|}

Goal scorers

Disciplinary record

See also
 2019–20 NISA season

References

American soccer clubs 2019 season
American soccer clubs 2020 season
2019 in sports in Tennessee
2020 in sports in Tennessee